Ptolemais was a coastal town of ancient Pamphylia or of Cilicia, inhabited during Hellenistic times. It was located between the Melas River and Coracesium.

Its site is located near Fığla Burnu, in Asiatic Turkey.

References

Populated places in ancient Cilicia
Populated places in ancient Pamphylia
Former populated places in Turkey
Hellenistic colonies in Anatolia
History of Antalya Province
Ptolemaic colonies